Moscow to Berlin: Red Siege is a PC title released by Cinemaware Marquee. Made by German-based INtex Publishing GmbH, the game takes place on the Eastern Front of World War II. The game is an addition to MonteCristo's World War II Battle collection, in the line of D-Day, Battle of the Bulge, Desert Rats. The fundamentals of gameplay are similar to the prequel games, but new units and settings bring fresh life into this game. True to life history lessons help the player evaluate their plans and strategy as they work on either German or Soviet campaigns in the fight from Moscow to Berlin.

Reception

Moscow to Berlin: Red Siege received mixed reviews from critics. On Metacritic, the game received a score of 57/100 based on 18 reviews, indicating "mixed or average reviews".

References

External links 

 

2006 video games
Real-time strategy video games
Video games developed in Germany
Windows games
Windows-only games
World War II video games
Video games set in the Soviet Union